SWAT 3: Close Quarters Battle is a 1999 tactical first-person shooter video game developed by Sierra Northwest and published by Sierra Entertainment exclusively for Microsoft Windows. It is the seventh installment of the Police Quest series and the third installment in the SWAT subseries. SWAT 3 follows the Los Angeles Police Department Metropolitan Division SWAT team as they combat a wave of violent crime and terrorism in Los Angeles in the lead-up to a nuclear disarmament treaty signing.

Unlike many other first-person shooter games, SWAT 3 places an emphasis on realistic police methods and tactics, including close-quarters battle tactics, proper use of force, and ideally arresting enemies rather than simply shooting them.

SWAT 3 was met by positive critical acclaim, with praise toward its graphics and AI sophistication. A sequel, SWAT 4, was released in 2005, developed and published by Irrational Games and Sierra owner Vivendi Universal.

Gameplay
In SWAT 3, players control a police tactical unit as they are deployed to handle situations such as arrest warrants, hostage-takings, bomb threats, and shootouts. SWAT 3 is a tactical shooter, where characters can be killed easily and in few hits; therefore, tactics and planning are emphasized over mere brute force. SWAT 3 is played as a team consisting of five to ten computer-controlled or player-controlled officers over a 16-mission campaign. Enemies, referred to as "suspects", range from individuals and small groups to trained and heavily-armed terrorists, with the game maintaining a learning curve for players as the complexity of suspects intensifies.

Unlike military shooters, such as the comparable Rainbow Six series, SWAT 3 emphasizes that the player is part of a police unit tasked with arresting suspects instead of killing them. Much of the game centers around following the rules of engagement, use of force policies, and proper police procedure. Violations of such policies—such as failing to recover evidence or dropped weapons, not securing hostages or surrendering suspects, attacking civilians or other officers, or using excessive force—results in penalties ranging from losing points to mission failure.

The weapons and equipment available to the player are tailored to fit the police setting of the game. Lethal firearms—handguns, rifles, submachine guns, and shotguns—are based on real weapons issued to the LAPD SWAT, such as their custom Springfield Armory M1911A1 that appears as the standard-issue sidearm in-game. Lethal weapons come with different varieties of ammunition, primarily less-lethal alternate weapons, such as the M4 carbine having a bean bag round launcher. Bullet penetration is simulated, making "spray and pray" fire risky due to the possibility of hitting an unseen NPC. Available equipment includes stun grenades and tear gas grenades to stun suspects; explosive breaching charges to break through locked doors; glow sticks to mark items or locations of note; multi-tools for utility actions such as lock picking; and most prominently the "Opti-Wand", a fiberscope-like camera on a telescoping wand used for safely looking around corners and through doorways. Officers wear body armor and enclosed combat helmets with built-in respirators and head-up display projectors inside the faceplate, used to explain the presence of the HUD. The HUD is minimal displays the player's crosshair, stance, commands, and health (the latter as vital sign sensor readings); health in particular cannot be healed or regenerated during a mission.

Missions can be approached in either stealth or dynamic mode. In stealth mode, the SWAT team moves slowly and deliberately, speaking softly and avoiding loud noises (e.g. quietly lock picking a locked door instead of kicking it down), giving the player the element of surprise. In dynamic mode, the team moves quickly, speaks loudly, and freely uses loud weaponry and equipment (such as breaching charges, grenades, and firearms) to clear an area rapidly. Modes are not set, and the player can freely shift between them, though the game automatically shifts from stealth to dynamic when the team is compromised by a loud noise or contact with a suspect.

Difficulty levels range through easy, medium and hard, affecting the aggression and likelihood of surrender of suspects. The player can also separately adjust reaction times for both officers and suspects, from 1 to 20 milliseconds.

SWAT 3 also includes a multiplayer mode, including traditional deathmatch and team deathmatch modes, as well as cooperative play using the singleplayer missions. Following the purchase of Sierra by Activision, the SWAT 3 multiplayer servers went down permanently, though unofficial third-party servers are still maintained by players.

SWAT 3 includes tools and support for modifying the game. A modding community has grown around SWAT 3, producing new missions, maps, weapons, and character models for use in both singleplayer and multiplayer modes.

Plot
In 2005, the United Nations prepares to sign the Nuclear Abolition Treaty at the Los Angeles Convention Center. The event draws world leaders, representatives, and tourists to Los Angeles, but also violent criminals and terrorists seeking to use the signing and the influx of dignitaries as a platform for their demands. Tasked with protecting the city and the delegates is the Los Angeles Police Department and their Metropolitan Division, with firepower and tactical needs being the responsibility of D Platoon, SWAT.

In July 2005, the LAPD executes a series of search warrants against members of the sovereign citizen doomsday cult Sovereign America. Shortly after, a series of attacks occur across the city: the Turkish consulate is bombed, and its ambassador kidnapped, by a Kurdish nationalist group, the Kurdish People's Party; the Hollywood Hills mansion of cable provider CEO Donald Foreman is invaded by an armed group that holds him and his family for ransom; and Orthodox patriarch Alexei III and his retinue are taken hostage by terrorists in a sprawling Orthodox cathedral. SWAT is deployed to handle each incident, and the LAPD learns Alexei III was planning to attend the signing ceremony.

Suddenly, an airliner carrying the President of Algeria is shot down by a surface-to-air missile, killing all passengers and crew aboard; the resulting chaos caused by the shutdown of LAX has created a significant number of vulnerable targets for more missiles, including the plane of Russian President Igor Stomas. SWAT locates the assassins, the Neo-Soviet communist People's Liberation Party, in a construction site and defeats them before they can fire another missile. Soon after, the PLP storms a television studio during an afternoon talk show, holding LA Mayor Marlin Fitzpatrick, Tolerance Defense League Chairman Herman Moyer, host Donna Briggs, and many members of the audience and station staff hostage, demanding an international broadcast for their message of Soviet reunification; the LAPD feigns the broadcast, distracting them for SWAT to move in and free the hostages.

The suspects responsible for the Foreman home invasion and the cathedral standoff are identified, and SWAT apprehends them at a nightclub. After foiling a bank heist by Sovereign America and rescuing a wounded off-duty detective from the robbers, SWAT is deployed to rescue Stomas from the PLP, who have raided his penthouse suite at the Carlysle Hotel and demand a flight to Moscow with the intention of taking Stomas with them.

The LAPD is authorized to deploy SWAT for VIP protection at the Convention Center, saving dignitaries at a pre-signing meeting from armed assailants. Attempts to disrupt the treaty signing by other terrorist groups are soon launched: the PLP seizes the LAX air traffic control tower, causes a mid-air collision, and installs a missile launcher on the tower to threaten Air Force One and the President of the United States; a World Trade Organization meeting at the Ventura Hotel is attacked following death threats from militias; and an electrical substation is bombed, cutting power to most of the city and allowing Sovereign America, including their leader Tobias Stromm, to take over Los Angeles City Hall. Further complicating matters, the LAPD learns Stromm won a suitcase nuke at a black market auction, and has placed one in the upper floors of City Hall, intent on destroying the entire city in a last stand. SWAT manages to defeat the terrorists, including Stromm and Sovereign America, and defuses the suitcase nuke. Power is soon restored to Los Angeles.

With the treaty signing imminent, the LAPD is put on alert. Investigating reports of "maintenance workers" with demolitions equipment seen entering a storm drain under a street where a parade is scheduled to pass, SWAT learns they are armed and are planning to attack the parade, and defeats them in a battle under the city. On the day of the treaty signing, August 6, 2005, SWAT is deployed to protect the Convention Center, but the PLP launches a final attack on the ceremony, taking the signatories hostage and hiding a second suitcase nuke in the building. SWAT defeats the PLP, rescues the signatories, and attempts to locate the suitcase nuke. The game's ending depends on whether the player manages to defuse the suitcase nuke: if they fail, the nuke detonates, destroying Greater Los Angeles and killing everyone in it; but if they succeed, the signing ceremony continues as planned, nuclear disarmament is achieved, and August 6 is designated Global Peace Day, while the LAPD SWAT returns to their duties.

Development
The game's producer is Rod Fung and the designer is Tammy Dargan; both were part of the team that developed Police Quest: SWAT. Initial development of SWAT 3 began in May 1997 and took over 18 months to complete, with 20 developers working on the game.

As the first first-person shooter of the Police Quest series, SWAT 3 received a new game engine, with cell and portal technologies for simulation of environments, and advanced AI and ballistics. The developers spent some time consulting with LAPD SWAT, including a real SWAT element leader and former LAPD chief Daryl Gates, to create an accurate, realistic simulation. Most of the animations in the game were motion captured from an actual SWAT officer.

A Dreamcast version was planned for release in 2000, but it was ultimately cancelled for unknown reasons.

SWAT 3 was released in three main versions:
 SWAT 3: Close Quarters Battle (November 30, 1999), the initial release.
 SWAT 3: Elite Edition (October 6, 2000), adding multiplayer, new game modes, and new missions. Included in the version 1.6 update.
 SWAT 3: Tactical Game of the Year Edition (October 10, 2001), adding new missions. Included in version 2.0 update. Retail copies included an 'Advanced Tactics CD' containing real-life SWAT training footage; this content is also available in the game's GOG.com release.

Older versions of the game can be upgraded to a newer version through a free download from the game's website.

Reception

Close Quarters Battle

SWAT 3 received "favorable" reviews according to the review aggregation website GameRankings. Praise was lavished on the graphics, along with the AI of enemies and civilians and team interaction.

Max Everingham reviewed the PC version of the game for Next Generation, rating it five stars out of five, and stated that "SWAT 3 offers a superb gaming experience. Red Storm may play the realism ticket, but Sierra is the one to have nailed it."

PC Gamer rated the game 91% and said: "All the best ideas from other squad based games, shoehorned into a police setting, perfectly." GameSpot commented that "SWAT 3's most impressive feature has to be the amazing artificial intelligence employed by friend and foe alike" and praising the graphics and level design, but criticized the lack of multiplayer in the initial release, the tendency for some dialogue to repeat, the need to "radio in" every suspect or hostage secured, and the need to restart missions from scratch should the player be wounded.

Tal Blevins of IGN praised SWAT 3's gameplay, graphics, level design, clean interface, briefings, dialogue, and AI (although noting an occasional tendency for computer-controlled SWAT officers to walk into the player's line of fire, resulting in friendly fire incidents). However, the lack of multiplayer and deficiencies in the game's manual were singled out for criticism.

SWAT 3 was a runner-up for Computer Gaming Worlds "Action Game of the Year" and PC Gamer US "Best Action Game" awards, both of which went to Rainbow Six: Rogue Spear. The editors of PC Gamer US wrote of SWAT 3s singleplayer mode, "graphically, environmentally, and tactically, it was unsurpassed among action games this year."

In the United States, SWAT 3s sales reached 40,095 copies by April 2000.

Elite Edition

The Elite Edition received "favorable" reviews according to the review aggregation website Metacritic.

Martin Taylor of Eurogamer praised the Elite Edition's graphics and level design, and particularly the new multiplayer component, citing efficient, low-lag networking code, and singling out the co-operative mode for its effectiveness. However, he criticized some flaws in multiplayer, admonishing the WON.net multiplayer service, noting that the deathmatch game mode can be dominated by one player with a fast connection camping in one area of the map, and critiquing the ease with which the arrest-based gameplay can break down in a fierce firefight. IGN's review of the Elite Edition was more positive in their review, highlighting the new multiplayer component and the new missions, but noting the presence of some bugs.

The Elite Edition received a "Silver" sales award from the Entertainment and Leisure Software Publishers Association, indicating sales of at least 100,000 copies in the United Kingdom.

See also 

 Ready or Not, a 2021 tactical shooter considered to be a spiritual successor to the Police Quest: SWAT series

References

External links
 Official website via Internet Archive
 

1999 video games
Cancelled Dreamcast games
Cooperative video games
Fictional portrayals of the Los Angeles Police Department
First-person shooters
Police Quest and SWAT
Sierra Entertainment games
Tactical shooter video games
Video games about bomb disposal
Video games about police officers
Video games set in 2005
Video games set in Los Angeles
Windows games
Windows-only games
Video games developed in the United States